Goat Story 2 (AKA - Goat story with Cheese) is a 2012 Czech 3D computer-animated comedy feature film. Directed by Jan Tománek and produced by Art And Animation studio. It is a sequel to the 2008 Goat Story. The film was animated by a changed team from the first film, with animators joining the project from countries such as Spain, Bulgaria and India. The film was released in 2D and 3D. The movie was rendered in in-house GPU renderer FurryBall. It was also probably the first world feature animated movie rendered completely on GPU.

In 2015 the producers put the movie on YouTube for free. As with the original, there are many language versions - the original Czech, English, Spanish, Portuguese, German, French, Turkish, Italian, Russian, and Hindi.

Plot
After the events of the first Goat Story, the Goat leaves old Prague for the fairy cheese kingdom. The king loves cheeses from the castle on a steep hill, because of which, according to the cunning chamberlain Kobyel, he has already emptied the cash register. In the village of Jemmy's Mácou, their children Honzík and Zuzanka and the goat make cheese. The king goes to sleep in the smell of their cheese and picks it up. The mare is amazed in the morning, the cheese makers have already disappeared. If someone does not set them free within three days, they will never see them again. The children go on a rescue expedition with the goat. The King will get intoxicating cheese from Kobyel. A goat with children in a pub under the castle finds out that the road to hell leads through the Devil's Mill. The rescuers will take Tall, Broad, and Sharp-eyed to help. However, they are incompetent. The expedition sees explosions in the distance. Then he sleeps in the woods. The king plays with the cheesecakes, whose "smell" drives everyone out of the castle. The expedition arrives at the cottage where the devil's grandmother lives. Honzík subtly picks up her living water. The mare confiscates the king's cheese and puts it in a sack. It inflates like a balloon and hangs over the castle. Lifeguards get lost in the woods. The supernatural power of the three helpers has waned, but in the end, thanks to the Insight, they will find the right direction. The scent attracts the king again. He tells Kobyl that morning and shows him a piece of cheese. Believing that he was ordering cheese, he signs a letter to the chamberlain, according to which he surrenders to the throne in his favor. He has no idea that the servant locked up all the cheese makers in the castle cellar, where they make cheese day and night. The mare on the balcony in the tower changes shape: suddenly it looks like the devil. The rescuers who arrived at the Devil's Mill will see two confused devils at night, but will not talk to them. Suddenly, Kobyl arrives (he has special wings attached) and kidnaps Zuzanka to the castle. The others know him. Honzík "revives" the properties of fairy-tale companions with living water and everyone rushes to the castle. Široký drinks water from the castle moat to the waterman. When they get inside the secret corridor, they will return the water. The mare will take the monarch's crown. The throne is his. Panic breaks out. The king hides in the crown hall. The goat and her friends will also arrive there. The mare lets everyone fall into the famine and goes to bed. Zuzanka climbs out of the bag quietly, the rope from the balloon with the cheese runs through the castle and ties Kobyl's toe. As the balloon rises, the Mare pulls through the castle. At the same time, the walls of the famine and cheese factory are broken down, freeing the prisoners. The villain hangs over the castle. The children will meet their parents. The mare will bring the devils from the mill to the band.

Cast
The film stars the voice talents of:
 Jiří Lábus as Goat
 Matěj Hádek as Jemmy
 Mahulena Bočanová as Katie
 Michal Dlouhý as Matěj
 Miroslav Táborský as Priest Ignác
 Karel Heřmánek as Devil / Leader
 Dalimil Klapka as Beggar
 Ota Jirák as Taverner
 Martin Dejdar as Student

See also
List of animated feature films
List of computer-animated films
List of musical films by year

References

External links
 Goat story 2 with Cheese on YouTube for free
 Official website (in Czech)
 

2012 films
2012 computer-animated films
Czech animated films
Czech sequel films
2010s teen films
2012 3D films
Films based on fairy tales
Czech animated comedy films
Czech animated fantasy films
Czech teen films